Ace TV (American Classic Entertainment Television) is an American family-oriented television network featuring television programming consisting of drama, sports, movies, entertainment, and other features, much of it repackaged from off-network and first-run syndication. Ace TV provides programming to television stations in the United States, especially low-power television stations. Ace TV can be found on Roku via the Glewed and SimulTV channels.

Programming 
Current programming on Ace TV includes:

 Acapulco H.E.A.T.
 Bonanza
 Booker
 The Commish
 Cracker
 Forensic Factor
 Hawkeye
 Mike Hammer
 Mom P.I.
 Murdoch Mysteries
 Stingray
 Tarzan
 Tenspeed and Brown Shoe
 Wiseguy

Sports 
Ace TV carries broadcasts of Total Combat and Extreme Fighting Championship (EFC) mixed martial arts (MMA) each week.

References

External links
 
On TV Tonight - Ace TV program listings

Television networks in the United States
Television channels and stations established in 2019
2019 establishments in the United States